Illbruck Challenge is a Volvo Ocean 60 yacht. She won the 2001–02 Volvo Ocean Race skippered by John Kostecki.

Illbruck Challenge was launched in 2001.

References

Volvo Ocean 60 yachts
Volvo Ocean Race yachts
Sailing yachts of Germany
Sailing yachts designed by Bruce Farr
Sydney to Hobart Yacht Race yachts
2000s sailing yachts